Milica Todorović (born 13 October 1990) is a Serbian singer and actress, who rose to prominence by winning the second season of the singing competition Zvezde Granda (2005).

Life and career 
Todorović was born on 13 October 1990 in Kruševac, SFR Yugoslavia. After a failed audition process for the first season of Zvezde Granda, she applied for the series a year later in 2005. Todorović was eventually declared the season two winner, becoming the show's youngest winner to date. Subsequently, she was signed to Grand Production, through which she released her first singles "Uporedi me"  and "Reci ja". 

Todorović also portrayed the character of Azra in the opera by Emir Kusturica based on his movie Time of the Gypsies. The play debuted at the Opéra Bastille, Paris in June 2007. After turning 18, Todorović released her debut album Pamitm ja in 2009.

She gained further popularity with the songs "Tri čaše" (2013) and "Moje zlato" (2014) featuring MC Yankoo, whose accompanying music videos have collected over one hundred million views on YouTube. Moreover, with over 160 million views, "Moje zlato" is currently the most viewed music video by a Serbian artist. In 2014, Todorović also competed on the Grand Music Festival with "Konačna odluka", placing as the runner-up. 

In August 2017, she collaborated with Emina Jahović on their commercially successful single "Limunada". Same year, she made a cameo performance of the popular Serbian folk song "Jutros mi je ruža procvetala" in the movie An Ordinary Man, starring Ben Kingsley.

In December 2022, Todorović was announced as the lead female character in the second season of the Serbian television series Pevačica.

Discography 
Studio albums
 Pamtim ja (2009)

Filmography

Awards and nominations

References

External links
 
 

1990 births
Living people
Serbian folk-pop singers
21st-century Serbian women singers
Grand Production artists
Actors from Kruševac
Musicians from Kruševac